Sean Matthews is an American politician. He is a Democratic member of the Delaware House of Representatives, representing District 10. He has been in office since 2014, when he challenged and defeated incumbent Democrat Dennis E. Williams, who he defeated again in 2016 when Williams attempted to retake his former seat. He is a teacher at Brandywine School District.

Electoral history
In 2014, Matthews won the Democratic primary with 694 votes (55%) against incumbent Democrat Dennis E. Williams. He went on to win the general election with 3,494 votes (55.2%) against Republican nominee Judith Travis.
In 2016, Matthews won the Democratic primary with 1,308 votes (75.5%) in a rematch against former representative Williams. Matthews went on to win the general election with 5,780 votes (57.5%) in a rematch against Republican nominee Judith Travis.
In 2018, Matthews won the general election with 6,448 votes (68.7%) against Republican nominee Erin Wienner.

References

External links
Official page at the Delaware General Assembly
 

Living people
Democratic Party members of the Delaware House of Representatives
21st-century American politicians
Year of birth missing (living people)